John Zinman is a film and television writer and producer. He has worked on the NBC drama series Friday Night Lights. He often works with writing partner Patrick Massett. He has been nominated for four Writers Guild of America (WGA) Awards for his work on Friday Night Lights.

Career

He was nominated for a Writers Guild of America (WGA) Awards for Best New Series at the February 2007 ceremony for his work on the first season of Friday Night Lights. He was nominated for the WGA Award for Best Dramatic Series the following year at the February 2008 ceremony for his work on the second season of Friday Night Lights. He was nominated for Best Dramatic Series a second time at the February 2009 ceremony for his work on the third season of Friday Night Lights. He was nominated for the WGA Award for Best Drama Series for the third consecutive year at the February 2010 ceremony for his work on the fourth season.

John Zinman and writing partner Patrick Massett are the writers of the film Lara Croft: Tomb Raider.

In November 2022, Zinman and Massett wrote a sequel to Wind River.

Filmography
 Lara Croft: Tomb Raider (2001, screenplay)
 Gold (2016, co-writer, producer)

References

Year of birth missing (living people)
Living people
American male screenwriters
American male television writers
American television writers